Fabian Alex Adams (born 7 January 1975) is a former Anguillan cricketer who played for the Leeward Islands in West Indian domestic cricket. A right-handed opening batsman, he was the first Anguillan to score a first-class hundred.

Adams made his first-class debut for the Leewards in May 1997, playing against Guyana in the 1996–97 Red Stripe Cup. He was out for five runs in the first innings, but made 69 not out in the second, opening the batting with Junie Mitchum. In February 2003, Adams made 103 not out against West Indies B, becoming the first Anguillan to score a first-class century. He finished the 2002–03 Carib Beer Cup season with 473 runs from seven games, behind only Stuart Williams for the Leewards. In the 2002–03 Red Stripe Bowl, in Williams' absence, Adams served as captain of the Rest of Leeward Islands team that played during Antigua and Barbuda's period as a separate participant. He played his final matches for the Leewards in the 2004–05 Regional Four Day Competition, aged 29. In 2006, Adams also played a single match for Anguilla in the Stanford 20/20 tournament, against Barbados.

References

External links
Player profile and statistics at CricketArchive
Player profile and statistics at ESPNcricinfo

1975 births
Living people
Anguillan cricketers
Leeward Islands cricketers
Rest of Leeward Islands cricketers
People from The Valley, Anguilla